Bill Bryant (15 January 1906 – 1 January 1995) was an Australian cricketer. He played one first-class match for Western Australia in 1926/27.

References

External links
 

1906 births
1995 deaths
Australian cricketers
Western Australia cricketers
Cricketers from Perth, Western Australia